Written in Red is the thirteenth studio album recorded by the Stranglers, released in January 1997 through the When! label. It was co-produced by Gang of Four's Andy Gill.

The media launch-party for Written in Red was held on 13 December 1996 at EuroDisney in Paris, and featured live performances of tracks from the effort. Other tracks performed at the event include "Always the Sun", "Golden Brown" and "Let Me Introduce You to the Family".

The week the album was released, the band performed at several HMV branches including those located in Birmingham, Nottingham, Sheffield and Leeds.

"In Heaven She Walks" was the only single to be taken from the album, released on 3 February 1997. The single was in two parts: the first CD featured a sleeve similar to the Written in Red cover, with a track listing of: "In Heaven She Walks", a live version of "Golden Brown" from 1995, and an extended version of "In Heaven She Walks". The second CD sleeve featured a still from the video; the tracks were "In Heaven She Walks", and live versions of "Grip" and "Something Better Change" (also from 1995).

It was the first Stranglers studio album that failed to reach the Top 40 in the UK Albums Chart, peaking at No. 52 in February 1997. In his review for AllMusic, Stephen Thomas Erlewine wrote that though the Stranglers sound "tight and professional," the album "lacks strong songs, making Written in Red an utterly undistinguished album."

In 2014, bass player Jean-Jacques Burnel said of the album, "...it had nothing to do with me apart from one or two songs. I've got no feelings about it as an album as I was disconnected from it all. I had given up on the band, it wasn't a band anymore, just John and Paul and a guy with Protools."

Track listing

2014 expanded vinyl edition
Written in Red was reissued as a 2-LP limited edition by Let Them Eat Vinyl, including 2 bonus tracks.

Tracks 12 and 13 are taken from the "In Heaven She Walks" CD single.

Personnel
 The Stranglers

 Paul Roberts – lead vocals, percussion, production
 Jean-Jacques Burnel – bass, vocals, production
 John Ellis – guitar, vocals, production
 Dave Greenfield – keyboards, vocals, production
 Jet Black – drums, production

 Additional musicians 
 Dave Billows – vocals

 Technical

 Andy Gill – production, mixing (5, 9)
 Cenzo Townsend – additional production, engineering assistance, mixing (1, 2, 4–11)
 Mike 'Spike' Drake – mixing (3)
 Jock Loveband – engineering
 Peter Schweir  – engineering
 Pete Woodruff – engineering
 Chris Madden – engineering
 Mitsou Tate – engineering assistance, additional programming
 Andrea Wright – engineering assistance
 Gordon Vicary – mastering
 Trevor Dawkins – equipment co-ordination  
 Ichiro Kono – photography
 Joe Wright – design, direction

Vinyl edition bonus tracks
 Max Bisgrove – mixing  (12)
 George Allen – mixing assistant (12)
 Cenzo Townsend – remixing (13)

References

External links
 http://www.stranglers.net

The Stranglers albums
1997 albums
Albums produced by Andy Gill